Buck Ortega (born November 22, 1981) is a former American football tight end who played in the National Football League. He was signed by the Washington Redskins as an undrafted free agent in 2006. He played college football at the University of Miami.

Ortega has also been a member of the Cleveland Browns, New Orleans Saints and Miami Dolphins.

Personal life
His wife is Emily Ortega.

Buck played college football at the University of Miami. At UM he played quarterback, tight end and special teams.

Buck played his high school football at Gulliver Prep in Miami, Florida. At Gulliver he played with deceased former NFL Star Sean Taylor. These two future NFL players led Gulliver to the 2000 2A State Football championship.

Following his time at the University of Miami, Buck played for the Washington Redskins, Cleveland Browns, and finally the New Orleans Saints.

His father, Ralph Ortega, played at the University of Florida, where he is enshrined among the hundred greatest players in that program's history as well as being selected to the hundred greatest player's in Florida High School football history after an impressive career at Coral Gables High School. Ralph was selected as the third pick in the second round of the 1975 NFL Draft by the Atlanta Falcons. He also played for the Miami Dolphins.

External links
Miami Hurricanes bio
New Orleans Saints bio

1981 births
Living people
Players of American football from Miami
American football tight ends
Miami Hurricanes football players
Washington Redskins players
Cleveland Browns players
Miami Dolphins players
New Orleans Saints players
Gulliver Preparatory School alumni